Meenmutty Falls may refer to:

Meenmutty Falls, Thiruvananthapuram, a waterfall in Thiruvananthapuram district in the Indian state of Kerala
Meenmutty Falls, Wayanad, a waterfall in Wayanad district in the Indian state of Kerala